These are the international rankings of Oman

International Rankings

References

Oman